Copyright (Amendment) Bill 2014 broadly refers to a set of proposed ordinances regulating the internet in Hong Kong. Under debate is the legality of derivative works popular on the internet, including doujin drawings, kuso, parodies, and the modification and adaptation of the lyrics in Hong Kong. Because of the upsurge of derivative work, the Hong Kong Government has amended related legislations in order to regulate the Internet, as well as legislation extending coverage to the existing network of Internet users. The bill was also dubbed the Internet Article 23 after the controversial Article 23 of the Basic Law which stroke curbing personal freedom.

Many people believe that related regulations will let the derivative work bear criminal responsibility easily, including the modified or adapted song or pictures. As a result, it strived to public opposition. Due to the opposition, the Government shelved the amendment in May 2012. By July 2013 the Government launched a consultation once again in order to let people discuss on how this type of "parody works" can be exempted from criminal responsibility.

Provisions 
The Bill amends various legislations, including –
 Copyright Ordinance, over the digital online copyright infringement;
 Personal Data (Privacy) Ordinance, over the online human flesh search engine problems;
 Control of Obscene and Indecent Articles Ordinance, over the problems of online sharing of pornographic movies and pictures;
 Prevention of Child Pornography Ordinance, over the problems of sharing information to children under 16 years old such as pornographic animations.

Discussion
On the controversial topic of whether allowing derivative work in Hong Kong, intense debate occurs in the city. People who are against re-creation deem it necessary to introduce legislation to regulate or even prohibit derivative work, with an aim to protect the  reputation and interest of the original author. They criticized those involved in derivative work for not respecting copyright.  Those against the law amendment reasoned that derivative works encompass too broad a spectrum for the legal restrictions to be justified, and that the amended law could stifle mass creativity, violating the freedom of creation. Criticisms about the emphasis on self-interest of productions were also fired, stating that the new law shows a lack of consideration for the public's right to enjoy derivatives and inhibits the expression of opinions about the original work. It has also been brought out that the original author has the right to distribute their work, which includes the prohibition of use, adaptation, selling and all kinds of derivation. As it depends on the acknowledgement of the author, it is doubtful as to whether derivative works violate copyright.

Re-consultation on Internet Article 23
On July 11, 2013, based on the issue users concern most about the amendment of the Copyright Ordinance, kuso work, the Government published the consultation document and offers three options, launched a three-month public consultation.

The first option has the same concessions proposed by the Government last year. Parody commonly disseminated on the Internet nowadays would likely fall outside the criminal net given that they would not normally displace the market of the copyright work and distribution of the same would unlikely cause “more than trivial economic prejudice” to the copyright owner. The second option specifies that the prejudicial distribution offense shall not apply to parodies, as long as the distribution in question meets the qualifying condition. The third option is recommended that, in accordance with Australia, Canada and the United Kingdom's experience and method, the distribution of parody would not infringe copyright and hence would not attract any criminal liability, as long as the act is considered as fair dealing.

On the same day, the Keyboard Frontline and the Concern Group of Rights of Derivative Works issued a joint declaration stated that they have received an email from the Intellectual Property Department in the afternoon on July 10, inviting related organizations concerned with the amendment of Copyright Ordinance to Central Government Offices at 11:30 am on July 11 to discuss parody issue of Copyright (Amendment) Bill. They believe that the Government invited them in less than 24 hours, questioned its sincerity, and suspected that the Government didn't welcome the organization opposing Copyright (Amendment) Bill 2011 and created the illusion of "consulted with the opposition". They said "very dissatisfied" and boycotted the meeting, reaffirmed that they urge the Government to fully exempt the legal responsibility of derivative work.

Related issues
The aim of distributing Internet Article 23 to boycott subordinate work On 3 June 2011, the Hong Kong government distributed the draft of Copyright (Amendment) Bill 2011 form in the Gazette. In the draft, it incorporated the netizens "parody" and other innovative works in the optional encroachment go. It at that point draw a ton of contention, the netizens felt that it would deny their right to speak freely and imaginative which ought to be secured by the Basic Law. There was much controversy among the society, the majority of the netizens tended to beg differ with the draft while some of the copyright holder tended to support. CHAN Kam-lam, one of the legislative councilors in Hong Kong said that he agreed with the draft, tons of kuso targeting Chan then being created and published online.
 
Netizens launched demonstrations to show their stands concerning the derivative work
On 4 December 2011, some social movement organizations like Keyboard Frontline and Netizens Power launched a demonstration which aimed to show their discontent about the draft of Copyright (Amendment) Bill 2011 version which defined derivative work as Criminal charge without any consultation in the society. Soon, the Government said that the second round debate of the draft will be restarted in the Legislative Council. Once again, the netizens launched another demonstration to show disagree and for this time, they even demonstrated to Central Government Offices.

References

External links
  The Copyright Ordinance
 Personal Data (Privacy) Ordinance
 The Control of Obscene and Indecent Articles Ordinance
 Prevention of Child Pornography Ordinance

Copyright legislation
Hong Kong legislation
Internet in Hong Kong
Derivative works